Henri Taverna was a French film editor. He worked on more than seventy productions between 1933 and 1974.

He was married to Louisette Hautecoeur, who was also a film editor.

Selected filmography
 Ciboulette (1933)
 Paloma Fair (1935)
 Southern Mail (1937)
 The Moorish Queen (1937)
 Savage Brigade (1939)
 The Marvelous Night (1940)
 The Mondesir Heir (1940)
 The Beautiful Adventure (1942)
 The Lost Village (1947)
 The Marriage of Ramuntcho (1947)
 Impeccable Henri (1948)
 The Chocolate Girl (1950)
 Adventures of Captain Fabian (1951)
 The Night Is My Kingdom (1951)
 The Lady from Boston (1951)
 Wolves Hunt at Night (1952)
 The Call of Destiny (1953)
 Mademoiselle from Paris (1955)
 Maigret Sets a Trap (1958)
 The Nina B. Affair (1961)
 The Triumph of Michael Strogoff (1961)
 Mathias Sandorf (1963)
 Piaf (1974)

References

Bibliography 
 McNulty, Thomas. Errol Flynn: The Life and Career. McFarland, 2011.

External links 
 

Year of birth unknown
Year of death unknown
French film editors